Glacier High School is an American public secondary school located in Kalispell, Montana, United States. Along with Flathead High School, it is one of two high schools in Kalispell School District #5.

History
Glacier High School was built between 2005 and 2007. It first opened for freshmen, sophomores, and juniors in the fall of 2007, adding the senior class in 2008. During the 2009–2010 school year, enrollment at Glacier was 1,254.

Athletics
The Glacier High School teams are known as the Wolfpack. They compete in class AA in Montana and there are eleven sports offered.

References

Public high schools in Montana
Schools in Flathead County, Montana